Alfreton is a civil parish and a town in the Amber Valley district of Derbyshire, England.  The parish contains 18 listed buildings that are recorded in the National Heritage List for England.  Of these, one is listed at Grade II*, the middle of the three grades, and the others are at Grade II, the lowest grade.  The listed buildings include two churches, a chest tomb and a sundial in a churchyard, houses and associated structures, a former village lock-up, a hotel, a milepost, a school and a war memorial.


Key

Buildings

References

Citations

Sources

 

Lists of listed buildings in Derbyshire
L